The Rolls-Royce Eagle was the first aircraft engine to be developed by Rolls-Royce Limited.  Introduced in 1915 to meet British military requirements during World War I, it was used to power the Handley Page Type O bombers and a number of other military aircraft.

The Eagle was the first engine to make a non-stop trans-Atlantic crossing by aeroplane when two Eagles powered the converted Vickers Vimy bomber on the transatlantic flight of Alcock and Brown in June 1919.

Background
At the outbreak of World War I in August 1914, the Royal Aircraft Factory asked Rolls-Royce to develop a new  air-cooled engine. Despite initial reluctance they agreed on condition that it be cooled by water rather than air, as this was the company's area of expertise.

Design and development

Development of the new 20 litre engine was led by Henry Royce from his home in Kent. The engine was also run faster, and an epicyclic reduction gear was designed to keep the propeller speed below 1,100 rpm. To reduce inertia and improve performance the valvetrain design was changed from sidevalves to a SOHC design, closely following the original "side-slot" rocker arm design philosophy used on the contemporary German Mercedes D.I, Mercedes D.II and Mercedes D.III straight-six aviation powerplants.

On 3 January 1915 the Admiralty ordered twenty-five of the new engines. The Eagle first ran on a test bed at Rolls-Royce's Derby works in February 1915, producing  at 1,600 rpm. This was quickly increased to 1,800, then in August 1915 to 2,000 rpm where it produced . The engine first flew on a Handley Page O/100 bomber in December 1915, the first flight of a Rolls-Royce aero engine.

Throughout World War I Rolls-Royce struggled to build Eagles in the quantities required by the War Office, but the company resisted pressure to license other manufacturers to produce it, fearing that the engine's much admired quality would risk being compromised.

After the War, a Mark IX version of the Eagle was developed for civilian use. Production continued until 1928, and in total 4,681 Eagle engines were built.

Time between overhaul (TBO) for later Eagles was around 100–180 hours.

Variants
Note:
Eagle I (Rolls-Royce 250 hp Mk I)
(1915), 225 hp, 104 engines produced in both left and right hand tractor versions.
Eagle II (Rolls-Royce 250 hp Mk II)
(1916), 250 hp, 36 built at Derby.
Eagle III (Rolls-Royce 250 hp Mk III)
(1917-1927), 250 hp, increased compression ratio (4.9:1), strengthened pistons. 110 built at Derby.
Eagle IV (Rolls-Royce 250 hp Mk IV)
(1916-17), 270/286 hp, 36 built at Derby.

Eagle V (Rolls-Royce 275 hp Mk I)
(1916-17), 275 hp, high-lift camshaft, 100 built at Derby.
Eagle VI (Rolls-Royce 275 hp Mk II)
(1917), 275 hp, first use of twin spark plugs, 300 built at Derby.
Eagle VII (Rolls-Royce 275 hp Mk III)
(1917-18), 275 hp, 200 built at Derby.
Eagle VIII
(1917-1922), 300 hp, extensive modifications, 3,302 built at Derby.
Eagle IX
(1922-1928), 360 hp, developed as a civil use engine, 373 built at Derby.

Applications

Admiralty N.S.3 North Sea Airship
Admiralty 23 Class Airship
Airco DH.4
Airco DH.9
Airco DH.10 Amiens
Airco DH.16
ANEC III
BAT F.K.26
Blackburn Blackburd
Curtiss H.12 Large America
Curtiss-Wanamaker Triplane
Dornier Do E
Dornier Wal
Fairey III
Fairey Campania
Felixstowe F.2
Felixstowe F.3
Felixstowe F.4
Felixstowe F.5
Fokker F.VII
Grahame-White G.W.E.7
Handasyde H.2
Handley Page Type O
Handley Page V/1500
Handley Page Type W
Hawker Horsley
Porte Baby
Porte Super Baby
Martinsyde F.1
Rohrbach Ro II
Rohrbach Ro III
Royal Aircraft Factory F.E.2
Royal Aircraft Factory F.E.4
Royal Aircraft Factory R.E.7
Short Bomber
Short N.1B Shirl
Short Type 184
Sopwith Atlantic
Sopwith Wallaby
Sopwith Tractor Triplane
Supermarine Commercial Amphibian
Supermarine Scarab
Supermarine Sea Eagle
Supermarine Swan
Van Berkel W-B
Vickers F.B.11
Vickers Valparaiso
Vickers Vernon
Vickers Viking
Vickers Vulcan
Vickers Vulture
Vickers Vimy
Wight Converted Seaplane

Engines on display
  
Examples of the Rolls-Royce Eagle are on display at the:
 Polish Aviation Museum, Kraków
 Science Museum, London
 Canada Aviation Museum
 South African National Museum of Military History, Johannesburg
 South African Air Force Museum, Port Elizabeth

One of the two Eagles that powered Alcock and Brown's historic transatlantic flight is on display at the Derby Industrial Museum.

Specifications (Eagle IX)

See also

References

Notes

Bibliography

 Lumsden, Alec. British Piston Engines and their Aircraft. Marlborough, Wiltshire: Airlife Publishing, 2003. .
 Pugh, Peter. The Magic of a Name - The Rolls-Royce Story: The First 40 Years. Duxford, Cambridge: Icon Books, 2001. .
 Rubbra, A.A.Rolls-Royce Piston Aero Engines - A Designer Remembers. Rolls-Royce Heritage Trust. Historical Series no 16. 
 Taulbut, Derek S. Eagle - Henry Royce’s First Aero Engine, Rolls-Royce Heritage Trust, 2011. .

External links

Images of the Rolls-Royce Eagle

Eagle
1910s aircraft piston engines
Airship engines